The 2007 Belarusian Premier League was the 17th season of top-tier football in Belarus. It started on April 14 and ended on November 10, 2007. BATE Borisov were the defending champions.

Team changes from 2006 season
Lokomotiv Minsk and Belshina Bobruisk were the two teams relegated after the 2006 season, having finished in 13th and 14th place respectively. They were replaced by 2005 First League champions Minsk and runners-up Smorgon. Lokomotiv Vitebsk changed their name to Vitebsk.

Overview
BATE Borisov won their 4th champions title and qualified for the next season's Champions League. The championship runners-up Gomel and 2007–08 Cup winners MTZ-RIPO Minsk qualified for UEFA Cup. Due to Premiere League expansion to 16 teams starting with next season, only one team (Minsk, who finished in the last place) relegated to the First League.

Teams and venues

League table

Results

Belarusian clubs in European Cups

Top scorers

See also 
2007 Belarusian First League
2006–07 Belarusian Cup
2007–08 Belarusian Cup

References 

 RSSSF

Belarusian Premier League seasons
1
Belarus
Belarus